A court of common pleas is a common kind of court structure found in various common law jurisdictions. The form originated with the Court of Common Pleas at Westminster, which was created to permit individuals to press civil grievances against one another without involving the King.

List
 Court of Common Pleas at Westminster
 Court of Common Pleas (Ireland)
 Court of Common Pleas of the County Palatine of Durham
 Court of Common Pleas of the County Palatine of Lancaster
 Delaware Court of Common Pleas
 New York Court of Common Pleas
 New Jersey Court of Common Pleas 
 Ohio Courts of Common Pleas
 Pennsylvania Courts of Common Pleas
 South Carolina Court of Common Pleas